Events from the year 1778 in France

Incumbents
 Monarch – Louis XVI

Events

6 February – Treaty of Alliance
27 July – Battle of Ushant

Births

Full date missing
Jacques Joseph Champollion-Figeac, archaeologist (died 1867)

Deaths

 30 May – Voltaire, writer, historian, and philosopher (born 1694)

Full date missing
François Alexandre Pierre de Garsault, botanist, zoologist and painter (born 1691)
Ladislas Ignace de Bercheny, Marshall of France (born 1689)
Pierre Laclède, fur trader, founder of St. Louis (born 1729)
Élisabeth Duparc, soprano singer
Jean-Baptiste Lemoyne, sculptor (born 1704)
Charles Clémencet, historian (born 1703)
Jean Girardet, painter (born 1709)

See also

References

1770s in France